Sibylle Keupen (* 1963 in Mayen) is a German politician (non-party, close to the Green Party) and a qualified pedagogue. She has been the Lord Mayor of Aachen since November 1, 2020.

Education and personal life 
During 1982-83 she studied the Pedagogy and Social sciences at the University of Bonn and in 1987 she graduated from University of Trier, specialization Pedagogy and Social sciences.

Sibylle Keupen is married, she has two adult sons and lives in Herzogenrath, district of Aachen.

Work 
Since her youth, she has been active for many years as a volunteer in a Catholic youth association with a focus on political education and women's work. She later worked as an actress and theater pedagogue in the independent theater scene. In 1994 she took over the management of the Bleiberger factory in Aachen. In 1997 she founded the youth art school there and was responsible for the development and expansion of innovative concepts and projects in cultural education. During this time she completed advanced training in solution-oriented consulting according to Steve de Shazer as a consultant for prevention work in the field of child protection for the Roman Catholic Diocese of Aachen. Since 2012 she has been responsible for training honorary staff and for developing institutional protection concepts.

In 2017, the general assembly of the Federal Association of Youth Art Schools and Cultural Education Institutions elected Keupen as deputy chairman. In addition, she is the chairwoman of the Prevention and Child Welfare Committee for the Federal Association for Cultural Education for Children and Young People and chairwoman of the women's network and spokeswoman for the network for continuing education in the Aachen city region.

See also 
List of mayors of Aachen

References 
This article uses text translated from the article Sibylle Keupen from the German Wikipedia, retrieved on 16 September 2021.

External links 
Profile page at Aachen.de

Mayors of Aachen
University of Bonn alumni
University of Trier alumni
1963 births
Living people